The 2016 Conference USA men's soccer tournament, was the 22nd edition of the tournament. It determined Conference USA's automatic berth into the 2016 NCAA Division I Men's Soccer Championship.

New Mexico won the CUSA title, making it their first CUSA championship. The Lobos defeated FIU in the championship, 3–0.

Seeding 

The top seven programs qualified for the CUSA Tournament.

Bracket

Awards

References 

Conference USA Men's Soccer Tournament
Conference Usa Men's Soccer